Piezochaerus is a genus of beetles in the family Cerambycidae, containing the following species:

 Piezochaerus bondari Melzer, 1932
 Piezochaerus marcelae Mermudes, 2008
 Piezochaerus melzeri Mermudes, 2008
 Piezochaerus monnei Mermudes, 2008

References

Acanthocinini